Fish Liew Chi-yu (born 31 March 1990) is a Malaysian-born Hong Kong model and actress. Began the career from 2012, she is best known for her role Ann Mui in the 2022 biographical musical drama film Anita, which earned her Best Supporting Actress at the 40th Hong Kong Film Awards. She also earned a nomination for the same category for her role Coco in Limbo.

Filmography

Movies

Dramas

Music Videos

Awards and nominations

References

External links 
 
 
 
 
 JamCast Management(HK)官方網站資料

1990 births
Living people
Hong Kong female models
Hong Kong actresses
21st-century Hong Kong actresses
Malaysian actresses
Malaysian female models